Marcelo José de Souza, nicknamed Marcelinho Paulista (born 13 September 1973) is a Brazilian former footballer who played as a midfielder.

He made his debut for the Brazil national team in 1994, and played four additional matches in the run-up to the 1996 Olympic Games. At the Olympics he only played against Portugal in what would be his final international match.

References

External links

1973 births
Living people
Brazilian footballers
Brazil under-20 international footballers
Brazil international footballers
Brazilian expatriate footballers
Association football midfielders
Footballers at the 1996 Summer Olympics
Olympic footballers of Brazil
Olympic bronze medalists for Brazil
Segunda División players
Super League Greece players
Botafogo de Futebol e Regatas players
Sport Club Corinthians Paulista players
UD Almería players
Fluminense FC players
Guarani FC players
Panionios F.C. players
Esporte Clube Juventude players
Associação Desportiva Cabofriense players
Olympic medalists in football
Expatriate footballers in Spain
Expatriate footballers in Greece
Footballers from São Paulo (state)
Medalists at the 1996 Summer Olympics